Carroll Inlet is an inlet,  long and  wide, trending southeast along the coast of Antarctica between the Rydberg Peninsula and Smyley Island. The head of the inlet is divided into two arms by the presence of Case Island and is bounded to the east by Stange Ice Shelf. It was discovered on an airplane flight, December 22, 1940, by members of the United States Antarctic Service (USAS) (1939–1941), and named after Arthur J. Carroll, chief aerial photographer on USAS flights from the East Base.

References 

Inlets of Palmer Land